Events from the year 1547 in France

Incumbents
 Monarch – Francis I (until March 31), then Henry II

Events
31 March – Francis I of France dies, and Henry II is the new King of France

Births

Full date missing
Jacques Rabelais, writer and scholar (died c.1622)

Deaths
 
31 March – Francis I of France (born 1494)

Full date missing
Louise de Montmorency, noblewoman (born 1496)
Marie of Luxembourg, Countess of Vendôme, princess (born c.1472))
Lazare de Baïf, diplomat and humanist (born 1496)
François Vatable, humanist scholar, Hellenist and Hebraist
André de Foix, military officer (born 1490)

See also

References

1540s in France